Throughout Russian history famines and droughts have been a common feature, often resulting in humanitarian crises traceable to political or economic instability, poor policy, environmental issues and war. Droughts and famines in the Russian Empire tended to occur fairly regularly, with famine occurring every 10–13 years and droughts every five to seven years. Golubev and Dronin distinguish three types of drought according to productive areas vulnerable to droughts: Central (the Volga basin, North Caucasus and the Central Chernozem Region), Southern (Volga and Volga-Vyatka area, the Ural region, and Ukraine), and Eastern (steppe and forest-steppe belts in Western and Eastern Siberia, and Kazakhstan).

Pre-1900 droughts and famines 
In the 17th century, Russia experienced the famine of 1601–1603, as a proportion of the population, believed to be its worst as it may have killed 2 million people (1/3 of the population). Other major famines include the Great Famine of 1315–17, which affected much of Europe including part of Russia as well as the Baltic states. The Nikonian chronicle, written between 1127 and 1303, recorded no less than eleven famine years during that period. One of the most serious crises before 1900 was the famine of 1891–1892, which killed between 375,000 and 500,000 people, mainly due to famine-related diseases. Causes included a large Autumn drought resulting in crop failures. Attempts by the government to alleviate the situation generally failed which may have contributed to a lack of faith in the Czarist regime and later political instability. In 1899, the Volga area, especially Samara, suffered starvation, typhus and scurvy, which depleted Red Cross aid.

List of post-1900 droughts and famines 

The Golubev and Dronin report gives the following table of the major droughts in Russia between 1900 and 2000. Mass famines were reported in years of drought in the 1920s and 1930s, and the last one occurred in 1946. 
 Central: 1920, 1924, 1936, 1946, 1984.
 Southern: 1901, 1906, 1921, 1939, 1948, 1995.
 Eastern: 1911, 1931.

1900s 
There was a famine in Russia in 1901-1902 (in which 49 governorates, or gubernias, were starving) and in 1906-1908 (starved from 19 to 29 governorates)

1910s 
During the Russian Revolution and following civil war there was a decline in total agricultural output. Measured in millions of tons the 1920 grain harvest was only 46.1, compared to 80.1 in 1913. By 1926 it had almost returned to pre-war levels reaching 76.8.

1920s 
The early 1920s saw a series of famines. The first famine in the USSR happened in 1921–1923 and garnered wide international attention. An estimated 16 million people may have been affected and up to 5 million died. Fridtjof Nansen was honored with the 1922 Nobel Peace Prize, in part for his work as High Commissioner for Relief In Russia. Other organizations that helped to combat the Soviet famine were International Save the Children Union and the International Committee of the Red Cross.

When the Russian famine of 1921 broke out, the American Relief Administration's director in Europe, Walter Lyman Brown,  began negotiating with Soviet deputy People's Commissar for Foreign Affairs, Maxim Litvinov, in Riga, Latvia. An agreement was reached on August 21, 1921, and an additional implementation agreement was signed by Brown and People's Commisar for Foreign Trade Leonid Krasin on December 30, 1921. The U.S. Congress appropriated $20,000,000 for relief under the Russian Famine Relief Act of late 1921.

At its peak, the ARA employed 300 Americans, more than 120,000 Russians and fed 10.5 million people daily. Its Russian operations were headed by Col. William N. Haskell. The Medical Division of the ARA functioned from November 1921 to June 1923 and helped overcome the typhus epidemic then ravaging Russia. The ARA's famine relief operations ran in parallel with much smaller Mennonite, Jewish and Quaker famine relief operations in Russia. The ARA's operations in Russia were shut down on June 15, 1923, after it was discovered that Russia renewed the export of grain.

While the Moscow government recognized the famine in Russia, authorities paid no attention to the famine's impact in Ukraine. Moreover, Lenin ordered to move trains full of grain from Ukraine to the Volga region, Moscow, and Petrograd, to combat starvation there. 1,127 trains were sent between fall 1921 and August 1922.

Soviet famine of 1932–1933 

The second major Soviet famine happened during the initial push for collectivization during the 30s. Major causes include the 1932–33 confiscations of grain and other food by the Soviet authorities which contributed to the famine and affected more than forty million people, especially in the south on the Don and Kuban areas and in Ukraine, where by various estimates millions starved to death or died due to famine related illness (the event known as Holodomor). The famine was perhaps most severe in Kazakhstan where the semi-nomadic pastoralists' traditional way of life was most disturbed by Soviet agricultural ambitions.

Demographic impact 

The demographic impact of the famine of 1932–1933 was multifold. In addition to direct and indirect deaths associated with the famine, there were significant internal migrations of Soviet citizens, often fleeing famine-ridden regions. A sudden decline in birthrates permanently "scarred" the long-term population growth of the Soviet Union in a way similar to, although not as severe, as that of World War 2.

Estimates of Soviet deaths attributable to the 1932–1933 famine vary wildly, but are typically given in the range of millions. Vallin et al. estimated that the disasters of the decade culminated in a dramatic fall in fertility and a rise in mortality. Their estimates suggest that total losses can be put at about 4.6 million, 0.9 million of which was due to forced migration, 1 million to a deficit in births, and 2.6 million to exceptional mortality. The long-term demographic consequences of collectivization and the Second World War meant that the Soviet Union's 1989 population was 288 million rather than 315 million, 9% lower than it otherwise would have been.  In addition to the deaths, the famine resulted in massive population movements, as about 300,000 Kazakh nomads fled to China, Iran, Mongolia and Afghanistan during the famine. A 2020 Journal of Genocide Research article by Oleh Wolowyna estimated 8.7 million deaths across the entire Soviet Union including 3.9 million in Ukraine, 3.3 million in Russia, and 1.3 million in Kazakhstan, plus a lower number of dead in other republics.

Although famines were taking place in various parts of the USSR in 1932–1933, for example in Kazakhstan, parts of Russia and the Volga German Republic, the name Holodomor is specifically applied to the events that took place in territories populated by Ukrainians and also North Caucasian Kazakhs.

Legacy 

The legacy of Holodomor remains a sensitive and controversial issue in contemporary Ukraine where it is regarded as an act of genocide by the government and is generally remembered as one of the greatest tragedies in the nation's history. The issue of Holodomor being an intentional act of genocide or not has often been a subject of dispute between the Russian Federation and Ukrainian government. The modern Russian government has generally attempted to disassociate and downplay any links between itself and the famine.

There is still debate over whether or not Holodomor was a massive failure of policy or a deliberate act of genocide. Robert Conquest held the view that the famine was not intentionally inflicted by Stalin, but "with resulting famine imminent, he could have prevented it, but put “Soviet interest” other than feeding the starving first—thus consciously abetting it". Michael Ellman's analysis of the famine found that "there is some evidence that in 1930-33 ... Stalin also used starvation in his war against the peasants", which he calls a "conscious policy of starvation", but concludes that there were several factors, primarily focusing on the leadership's culpability in continuing to prioritize collectivization and industrialization over preventing mass death, due to their Leninist stance of regarding starvation "as a necessary cost of the progressive policies of industrialisation and the building of socialism", and thus did not "perceive the famine as a humanitarian catastrophe requiring a major effort to relieve distress and hence made only limited relief efforts."

1940s 
During the Siege of Leningrad by Nazi Germany, as many as one million people died while many more went hungry or starved but survived. Germans tried to starve out Leningrad in order to break its resistance. Starvation was one of the primary causes of death as the food supply was cut off and strict rationing was enforced. Animals in the city were slaughtered and eaten. Instances of cannibalism were reported.

The last major famine in the USSR happened mainly in 1947 as a cumulative effect of consequences of collectivization, war damage, the severe drought in 1946 in over 50 percent of the grain-productive zone of the country and government social policy and mismanagement of grain reserves. In Ukraine, between 100,000 and one million people may have perished. In Moldova, according to Soviet officials, the famine claimed the lives of more than 150,000 people, while historians estimate that this figure reaches at least 250,000-300,000 people.

1947–1991 
After 1947 there were no known famines. The drought of 1963 caused panic slaughtering of livestock, but there was no risk of famine. After that year the Soviet Union started importing feed grains for its livestock in increasing amounts.

Post-Soviet Russia 
Since the collapse of the Soviet Union, there have been occasional issues with hunger and food insecurity in Russia. Both Russia and Ukraine were subject to a series of severe droughts from July 2010 to 2015.  The 2010 drought saw wheat production fall by 20% in Russia and subsequently resulted in a temporary ban on grain exports.

See also 
 1921–1922 famine in Tatarstan
 Kazakh famine of 1930–1933 
 Holodomor
 Hunger Plan
 List of famines
 Russian famine of 1921–1922
 Siege of Leningrad
 Soviet famine of 1930–1933
 Soviet famine of 1946–1947
 Trofim Lysenko

Notable victims 
 Aleksey Shakhmatov
 Alexander Blok

References

Footnotes

Notations

External links 
 
 Art and photographs from the Great Famine
 The Years of Hunger: Soviet Agriculture, 1931–1933

Economic crises in Europe
Russia
Disasters in the Soviet Union
Disasters in Russia
Agriculture in the Soviet Union
Russia
Russia